NGC 7812 (also known PGC 195) as is an intermediate spiral galaxy in the constellation Sculptor, though it might look like it is in Pisces if observed at the wrong angle. The galaxy was discovered on 25 September 1865 by Sir John Hershel. At its widest, it measures approximately 100-thousand light years (30660 parsecs) across, and is 315 million light years away from Earth.

See also 
 List of NGC objects (7001–7840)

References

External links 

Astronomical objects discovered in 1865

Discoveries by John Herschel

7812
Intermediate spiral galaxies
Sculptor (constellation)